Halsema may refer to:

Name

Lawyer
 Diderik Frederik Johan van Halsema, Dutch linguist, lawyer and judge during the Dutch Republic

Politicians
 Eusebius Julius Halsema (1882–1945), an American engineer who served as the mayor of Baguio City, Philippines from 1920 to 1937
 Femke Halsema, mayor of Amsterdam since June 2018

Places

Highway
 Halsema Highway, a Philippine major highway in northern Luzon